Bertya gummifera is a sticky shrub in the family Euphorbiaceae, endemic to New South Wales.  It grows in woodland and often in sandstone areas. It flowers in spring.

Description

Bertya gummifera is a sticky shrub, growing from 1–2 m high. The young growth is covered long whitish hairs, which sometimes persist on the stems, but most of the plant loses these and becomes rough and hairless with age. The rough-surfaced leaves are 10–50 mm long and about 2 mm wide, and have margins which are rolled downwards from the upper surface (revolute). The flowers (with and without stalks) are crowded, and have 5-8 bracts. The male flowers have triangular outer bracts which are shorter and less broad than the inner bracts and the perianth segments are about 4 mm long and a reddish brown. The female flowers have narrower bracts, and their perianth segments enlarge and enclose the fruit.

The capsule is up to 12 mm long and about 7 mm in diameter.  The species was first described as Bertya gummifera by the botanist Jules Émile Planchon in 1845.

References

External links 
 Bertya gummifera Occurrence data from the Australasian Virtual Herbarium
 Bertya gummifera PlantNET – Description

gummifera
Flora of New South Wales
Taxa named by Jules Émile Planchon
Plants described in 1845